This is a list of Tamil language television series produced in India that have been released.

List of television series by year

2017

2018

2019

2020

2021

2022

2023

Notes

References

External links 

 web series
 
+